The Boeing Model 64 was an American single engine biplane training aircraft built by Boeing in the 1920s that failed to gain any orders.

Development and design 

The Model 64 was built by Boeing at their own expense, and submitted to both the US Army and US Navy as a primary and gunnery training aircraft. The fuselage and tail was constructed of welded steel tubing, with wood wings spars and ribs. The wings used reverted to an earlier two bay design, due to aerodynamic problems with the Model 21/NB. For gunnery training a removable rear cockpit structure was built to carry a gun ring and flexible machine gun. A fixed synchronized gun could also be mounted to fire through the propeller.

The Model 64 first flew in February 1926. Later, the wings were replaced with ones using the thicker NACA Munk M-12 airfoil and which required only one set of struts. The updated plane first flew on 31 August 1926.

The aircraft was sold to Pacific Air Transport, later fitted with a Wright J-5 engine and resold to a private owner.

Operators

 Pacific Air Transport

Specifications (seaplane)

References

 Bowers, Peter M. Boeing aircraft since 1916. London: Putnam Aeronautical Books, 1966.

Boeing Model 064
064
Single-engined tractor aircraft
Biplanes
Aircraft first flown in 1926